The Men's compound 30m event at the 2010 South American Games was held on March 23 at 11:15.

Medalists

Results

References
Report

30m Compound Men